Hojatoleslam Seyyed Ali Akbar Aboutorabi Fard (1939 – June 2, 2000) was an Iranian revolutionary. During the Iran–Iraq War, he assisted in the organization of an Iranian militia but was captured by Iraqi forces and spent 10 years in Iraqi prisons. Upon his release, he became the Supreme Leader's representative to Azadegan Affairs Headquarters and Tehran's representative in the 4th and 5th terms of the Islamic Consultative Assembly.

Early life and education 
Hojatoleslam Seyyed Ali Akbar Aboutorabi Fard was born in 1939 in Qazvin. During his childhood, he saw all Reza Shah’s violence against religion and seminaries and clerics of Islam. He also saw women of family stay at home in Kashfe hijab time and found his ancestors in fight path against Pahlavi’s irreligion plans.
 
He was a champion at a swimming was the champion in swimming event Amjadiyeh in Tehran and was the top player in football and volleyball in high school. In 1957 after finishing high school his travel to insisted that he would go to Germany and continue his education there. He thought continued studying in seminaries would leave him poor and needy. But after a little hesitation in Qom, in 1958 he went to Mashhad to learn regional science hence he could to escape his uncle's insistence. However he made a covenant with himself to never get financial assistance, even from his father. In Mashhad, he was living in paltry room in Navvab School and was engaged in teaching and learning.

With beginning of Imam Khomeini’s movement, he found Qom as the center of struggle so he returned there in 1963. He resided in the Hojjatie School to be engaged in Khomeini's companions activities.

Marriage 
In 1967, Aboutorabi came back to Iran and married at the age of 28. He then moved to Najaf with his wife.

Before the Islamic Revolution

Devotees of Islam 
He attended the ceremony for the Devotees of Islam and was a spectator at their gatherings when he was a teenager.

Uprising of 15 Khordad 
Abutorabi also was beaten when police rushed to the Feyziyeh School in the June 5, 1963 (15 Khordad) demonstrations in Iran.

Migration to Najaf 
Following the suppression of 1963 uprising and Imam Khomeini's exile to Najaf, he moved to Najaf and attended classes of Imam Khomeini and other clerics. To travel to Najaf, he went to Basra secretly through Khorramshahr's port and then traveled to Najaf.

Arrest 
In 1970, Aboutorabi and his wife and children returned to Iran on the pretext of meeting the family, with Imam Khomeini's statement about Ayatollah Saeedi, who was killed in SAVAK's prison, embedded in his suitcase. Pahlavi regime's security forces, who were awaiting Imam Khomeini's reaction about Ayatollah Saeedi's death, strongly controlled the Khosravi border crossing. They therefore arrested Aboutorabi when he was crossing the border, and took him to SAVAK station in Kermanshah when they found the statements. He was moved to Tehran one day later.

The cunning of Aboutorabi in dealing with SAVAK interrogators and normal response to questions, led to be not very long his prison term, though SAVAK officials were not convinced. Six months later, after much torture and harassment, Aboutorabi was released from prison.

After release 
He tried to go to Najaf after his release, but he did not succeed. So he continued his political struggle in Iran and organized an armed struggle along with Seyyed Ali Andarzgo. They were repeatedly prosecuted by SAVAK, but they maintained a high level of secrecy to the extent that very little of these activities has been recorded. Aboutorabi's control operation was codenamed “Saghar” meaning goblet. With the spread of Islamic Revolution, SAVAK had no opportunity to arrest him.

During Islamic Revolution, he was commander of group of people who seized Sa'dabad Palace and protected the facility in the palace until delivered to competent authorities.

He in collaboration with his brother, Hojatoleslam Sayyed Mohammad Aboutorabi, played important role in seizing of Qazvin Army garrison and prevented from leaving weapons and war equipment. He had a close relationship with Mohammad-Ali Rajai, Mohammad Beheshti, and Ali Khamenei, and participated the welcoming committee on the arrival of Imam Khomeini in Iran.

After Iranian Revolution 
He formed and directed the Islamic Revolution Committee in Qazvin, his ancestral city, for organizing and to avoid anarchy. After a while following a popular vote he became a member of the City council and afterward undertook the presidency.

The Imposed War 
Soon after the Islamic Revolution, the Imposed War began. With start of the War, he accompanied Mostafa Chamran in Irregular Warfare Headquarters to organize the militia. He was going on difficult exploration mission himself. Liberation of “Dobb-e Hardan”, the adventurous and dangerous area, is one of his actions as a commander of a group of 100 fighters.

Captivity 
Eventually, on December 17, 1980, while returning from a reconnaissance mission, he was identified and captured by enemy forces, while his distance from friendly forces was 7 km.
 
Aboutorabi says about the early days of his captivity:"several times in jail they took me to the gallows and counted 1 and 2 for extracting confessions but each time they took me back. During the day, they took and brought me several time. Eventually at night they took me to Al-Amare school. An Iraqi general told those who were there: he has not right to sleep; we come back at midnight for extracting confessions, if he did not have enough information, we would nail his head. They came back at midnight and nailed my head, but it was not such a hit to die."

When Abutorabi was tortured in Iraq, it was rumoured in Iran that he had been martyred. Commemorations, lectures by prominent persons such as Mohammad-Ali Rajai, day-off and mourning  in the city of Qazvin, participation of Hashem Rasuli and Yousef Saanei and Mohammad-Ali Nezamzade at his commemoration on behalf of  Imam Khomeini to convey the message of condolence made clear the dimensions of character of Aboutorai. So Iraqi government recognized him as a prominent cleric.

Iraqi officials wanted to kill him, but an Iraqi general rejected since he was Sayyid and descendants of the Islamic prophet Muhammad. Iraqi officials repeatedly moved him from camp to another, including Camp Anbar, Camps Mosul 1, 2, 3 and 4, Camp Romadie, Camp Tikrit. Iranian captives loved Aboutorabi very much because of his way in leadership of captives. He was nicknamed “Seyyed-e Azadegan”, means sir of released war captives, because of his way to deal with captivity and encouraging the captives. Even Iraqi soldiers were impressed by his personality. For example, an Iraqi Major told Aboutorabi: "if Khomeini is like you, I will follow him."

After captivity 
Finally, after ten years of captivity, he returned to his homeland to a popular welcome. He was appointed as the representative of the Supreme Leader in Azadegan (released war captives) Affairs Headquarters. In the fourth and fifth sessions of the Islamic Consultative Assembly, he was the second and third representative from Tehran.

Death 
Alongside his father Haj Seyyed Abbas Aboutorabi, he was killed in a car crash on June 2, 2000, when they were on their way to Mashhad for Imam Reza pilgrimage. They were buried in the Sahn Azadi (freedom courtyard) of the Imam Reza shrine on the anniversary of Imam Reza's martyrdom.

Professors 

 Ali Meshkini
 Hossein Vahid Khorasani
 Ruhollah Khomeini
 Alipanah Ishtihardi
 Mojtaba Qazvini Khorasani

References

2000 deaths
Iranian Irregular Warfare Headquarters guerrillas
Iranian Shia clerics
Iranian revolutionaries
1939 births
People from Qazvin
Members of the 4th Islamic Consultative Assembly
Members of the 5th Islamic Consultative Assembly
Association for Defence of Revolution Values politicians
Islamic Revolution Committees personnel
Society of Devotees of the Islamic Revolution politicians
Burials at Imam Reza Shrine